The Zürich Opera House is an opera house in the Swiss city of Zürich. Located at the Sechseläutenplatz, it has been the home of the Zürich Opera since 1891, and also houses the Bernhard-Theater Zürich. It is also home to the Zürich Ballet.

History 

The  burnt down in 1890. The new  (municipal theatre) was built by the Viennese architects Fellner & Helmer, who changed their previous design for the theatre in Wiesbaden only slightly. 

It was built in only 16 months and was opened in 1891 and became the first opera house in Europe to have electrical lighting.

It was the city's main performance space for drama, opera, and musical events until 1925, when it was renamed  and a separate theatre for plays was built: The Bernhard Theater opened in 1941, in May 1981 the Esplanada building was demolished, and the present adjoint building opened on 27/28 December 1984 after three years of transition in the Kaufhaus building nearby Schanzengraben.

By the 1970s, the opera house was badly in need of major renovations; when some considered it not worth restoring, a new theatre was proposed for the site. However, between 1982 and 1984, rebuilding took place but not without huge local opposition which was expressed in street riots. The rebuilt theatre was inaugurated with Wagner’s Die Meistersinger von Nürnberg and the world première of Rudolf Kelterborn’s Chekhov opera Der Kirschgarten.

As restored, the theatre is an ornate building with a neo-classical façade of white and grey stone adorned with busts of Weber, Wagner, and Mozart. Additionally, busts of Schiller, Shakespeare, and Goethe are to be found. The auditorium is built in the neo-rococo style and seats approximately 1200 people. 

Corporate archives and historical library collections are held at the music department of the Predigerkirche Zürich.

The Opera House also holds concerts by its Philharmonia orchestra, matinees, Lieder evenings and events for children. The Zürich Opera Ball is organised every year in March, and is usually attended by prominent names.

Opera Studio 
The Zürich Opera House is also home of the International Opera Studio (in German: Internationales Opernstudio IOS) which is a educational program for young singers and pianists. The studio was created in 1961 and has renowned artists currently teaching such as Brigitte Fassbaender, Hedwig Fassbender, Andreas Homocki, Rosemary Joshua, Adrian Kelly, Fabio Luisi, Jetske Mijnssen, Ann Murray, Eytan Pessen or Edith Wiens.

Youth protests of 1980
In response to the combination of high subsidies for the Opera and the lack of cultural programs for the youth in Zürich, large protests were held in May 1980. The protests became known as the Opernhauskrawalle youth protests – Züri brännt, meaning Zurich is burning, as documented in the 1981 Swiss documentary film of the same name.

Financing 
Opernhaus Zürich AG is organised pursuant to Swiss law as a company limited by shares and it operates a music theater and Ballet under the authority of Canton of Zurich that has been providing the main funding since 1995.
Both Swiss banks, UBS and Credit Suisse, are partners of Opernhaus Zürich AG.

References

External links

Zürich Opera’s official website
 

Opera houses in Switzerland
Concert halls in Switzerland
Cultural property of national significance in the canton of Zürich
Tourist attractions in Zürich
Theatres completed in 1834
Music venues completed in 1834
Theatres completed in 1891
Music venues completed in 1891
Fellner & Helmer buildings
Cultural venues in Zürich
19th-century architecture in Switzerland